Lin Chong is a fictional character in Water Margin, one of the Four Great Classical Novels in Chinese literature. Nicknamed "Panther Head", he ranks sixth among the 36 Heavenly Spirits. In some folk tales derived from the novel, he is said to have learnt martial arts from Zhou Tong, who purportedly trained the Song dynasty general Yue Fei in archery.

Background
Lin Chong resembles Zhang Fei, a general of the Three Kingdoms era, in appearance. Over six chi tall, he has piercing eyes and a head like that of a panther, which earns him the nickname "Panther Head". He is a martial arts instructor of the Imperial Guards in Dongjing (東京; present-day Kaifeng, Henan), the imperial capital of the Song dynasty.

Framed and exiled
Lin Chong introduces himself to Lu Zhishen when he sees the monk working out with his hefty staff and is deeply impressed. Lu tends a vegetable plot for a temple in Dongjing. They become sworn brothers. While they are chatting, Gao Yanei, the play-boy adopted son of Grand Marshal Gao Qiu, runs into Lin Chong's wife in a temple and tries to force himself on her. Lin rushes to the temple and saves his wife in time. Afraid of inviting trouble, he decides not to report the case to the authorities. However, besotted with Lin's wife, Gao Yanei seeks the help of Lin's friend Lu Qian. Lu invites Lin Chong out for a drink, during which Mrs Lin is tricked to go to Lu's house, where Gao Yanei attempts to rape her. Mrs Lin‘s maid escapes and informs her master, who rushes to Lu Qian's house. Gao Yanei flees upon learning that Lin is coming.

Gao Yanei asks his adoptive father to help him get hold of Lin Chong‘s wife. Knowing Lin loves good weapons, Gao Qiu sends a man to trick him to buy a rare sword on the street. The Grand Marshal then summons Lin Chong to his residence claiming that he wants to see his new possession. Lin, carrying the sword, unsuspectingly enters the White Tiger Hall, where meetings on top-secret state matters are held and arms are prohibited. Gao Qiu accuses Lin of wanting to assassinate him and orders his arrest.

Lin Chong is tattooed on the face and exiled to Cangzhou. Before he is on the way, he insists on divorcing his wife so that she can find a better husband. Meanwhile, Gao Qiu bribes the two guards escorting Lin Chong to kill him along the way. During the journey, the escorts mistreat Lin, including scalding his feet at one point. At Wild Boar Forest, just as they are about to kill Lin after tying him to a tree, Lu Zhishen springs out from behind the trunk, disarms them, and wants to finish them off. He is prevented by Lin Chong, who tells him that they are just stooges of Gao Qiu. Lu Zhishen accompanies Lin  to Cangzhou and takes leave only after ensuring the escorts would try no more mischief.

In Cangzhou, Lin Chong befriends the nobleman Chai Jin. His impressive skill in thrashing a boastful and arrogant martial arts instructor, who lives off Chai, wins the scion's admiration. Chai provides him money to bribe the jailers not to make his life in prison miserable.

Burning of the fodder depot
Gao Qiu sends Lu Qian and his steward Fu An to Cangzhou on a second attempt to kill Lin Chong. Lu Qian bribes the chief warden and a jailer, and they work out a plan involving assigning  Lin to be a solo watchman at a fodder depot. 

On the day Lin Chong takes up his new duty, Lu Qian, Fu An and the jailer set fire to the depot after nightfall, certain that he must be trapped in the inferno. However, Lin Chong has earlier gone out to buy wine and upon return found his hut in the depot crushed under the weight of snow. He then took shelter in a nearby temple. Upon seeing that the depot is on fire, he hurries towards it. But he overhears the three men talking outside the temple and learns that the fire is their work. Enraged, he charges out, kills the three men and offers their heads to the deity of the temple. He then flees the scene.

Becoming an outlaw
While on the run, Lin Chong meets Chai Jin again, who suggests he joins the outlaws at Liangshan Marsh. Chai writes a recommendation letter for him addressed to Wang Lun, the chief of Liangshan. Lin comes to an inn, which is an outpost of the stronghold managed by Zhu Gui. Zhu ushers him across the marsh and up the hill.

At Liangshan, Wang Lun fears Lin Chong, with his superior fighting skill, will usurp his position, so he tries to send him away with excuse and gifts.  As Lin Chong pleads to stay, Wang Lun sets the condition that he must kill a man in three days and present the person‘s head as his ticket of enrolment. On the third day, Lin Chong encounters Yang Zhi and they fight to a standstill. Wang Lun comes to the scene, stops the fight, and invites Yang to join his band in the hope that he would be a counterweight to Lin Chong. But Yang declines and leaves. Wang Lun reluctantly lets Lin Chong stay and take the fourth position under himself, Du Qian and Song Wan.

When Chao Gai and his six friends come to Liangshan to seek refuge after being discovered by authorities to be the hijackers of birthday gifts in transportation to the Grand Tutor Cai Jing, Wang Lun again feels threatened. He tries to send them away with gifts. Frustrated with Wang Lun's selfishness and incited by Wu Yong, Lin Chong kills the leader. Chao Gai is elected the new chief of Liangshan, with Lin being placed fourth after Wu Yong and Gongsun Sheng. Lin then seeks news about his wife and is sad to hear that she has hanged herself to avoid harassment by Gao Yanei.

Death
Lin Chong is appointed as one of the Five Tiger Generals of the Liangshan cavalry after the 108 Heroes came together in what is called the Grand Assembly. 

When Gao Qiu personally leads a military attack on Liangshan, he ends up being captured. Some later editions of Water Margin say Lin Chong wants to kill Gao for reprisal. But an earlier edition said he is resigned to his fate, no longer keen on revenge. The 120-chapter edition of Water Margin depicts him as merely staring at Gao as the latter is escorted into Liangshan's main hall after his capture. The earlier 100-chapter edition does not even mention this. Song Jiang treats Gao as an honoured guest and releases him hoping he will obtain amnesty from Emperor Huizong for Liangshan.

After the amnesty, the Liangshan heroes are sent to fight the Liao invaders and put down the rebel forces of Tian Hu, Wang Qing, and Fang La in Song territory. Lin Chong makes significant contributions in the series of campaigns. Just when the missions are all over, Lin Chong is stricken by paralysis. He dies six months later under the care of Wu Song in Liuhe Temple in Hangzhou, where Lu Zhishen had died six months earlier.

Cultural references

 In the 2022 cyber thriller, Rise of the Water Margin, Lin Chong is a main protagonist and commander of China's cyber warfare Unit 61398 who is framed, disgraced, and on the run. Hunted for a trumped-up act of treason and manslaughter, he takes refuge at a hacker enclave in one of China’s deserted “ghost cities” known by its investors as the Mount Liang Swamp.  Devastated by his wife’s suicide, he unleashes a cyber-weapon that threatens to draw China and the US into a nuclear war.

 In Beijing opera, there are two plays about Lin Chong's journey to becoming an outlaw. The first, "Wild Boar Forest", is based on the part of Lu Zhishen saving Lin Chong from the escorts when they are about to kill him during his exile trip to Cangzhou. The second, "Lin Chong Flees by Night", is based on the burning of the fodder depot and Lin Chong's flight to Liangshan Marsh.

In the Japanese 1973 TV adaptation, Lin Chong (respelled Lin Chung; played by Atsuo Nakamura) is the lead character in the series, being portrayed as the unofficial leader of the Mount Liang rebels.

See also
 Minor characters in Lin Chong's story for a list of supporting minor characters from Lin Chong's story.

References
 
 
 
 
 
 
 

36 Heavenly Spirits
Fictional characters from Henan